Novoselivka Druha is a village in Yasynuvata Raion (district) in Donetsk Oblast of eastern Ukraine, at 25.4 km north from the centre of Donetsk city.

The War in Donbass, that started in mid-April 2014, has brought along both civilian and military casualties. One Ukrainian serviceman was killed at the village on 24 January 2015, another soldier was wounded on 4 September 2017. On 4 July 2022, the village was captured by the Russian forces during the invasion of Ukraine at the Battle of Avdiivka.

Demographics
In 2001 the settlement had 131 inhabitants. Native language as of the Ukrainian Census of 2001:
Ukrainian — 28.24%
Russian — 71.76%

References

Villages in Pokrovsk Raion